Barbarofusus kobelti is a species of sea snail, a marine gastropod mollusk in the family Fasciolariidae, the spindle snails, the tulip snails and their allies.

Description

Distribution
This marine species occurs off Southern California.

References

External links
- Callomon P. & Snyder M.A. (2017). A new genus and nine new species in the Fasciolariidae (Gastropoda: Buccinoidea) from southern California and western Mexico. Proceedings of the Academy of Natural Sciences of Philadelphia. 165(1): 55-80

kobelti
Gastropods described in 1877